The 1932 Santa Clara Broncos football team was an American football team that represented Santa Clara University as an independent during the 1932 college football season.  In their fourth season under head coach Maurice J. "Clipper" Smith, the Broncos compiled a 6–3 record and outscored opponents by a total of 121 to 41.

Schedule

References

Santa Clara
Santa Clara Broncos football seasons
Santa Clara Broncos football